Fincantieri Marinette Marine (FMM) is an American shipbuilding firm in Marinette, Wisconsin. Marinette Marine was a subsidiary of Manitowoc Marine Group of Wisconsin from 2000 to 2009, when it was sold to Fincantieri Marine Group.

History

Marinette Marine Corporation (MMC) was founded on the Menominee River in Marinette, Wisconsin, in 1942 as part of the growth in the American shipbuilding industry during World War II.

In 2000 Marinette Marine, a privately held company, was purchased by The Manitowoc Company for approximately $48 million.  On August 4, 2008, the Manitowoc Company announced that it had signed an agreement to sell their Manitowoc Marine Group division, which includes Marinette Marine, to Fincantieri Marine Group Holdings, Inc. and minority investor Lockheed Martin.  The sale was completed on January 1, 2009 to Fincantieri. The net purchase price in the all-cash deal was approximately $120 million.

Since its founding, Marinette Marine has produced more than 1,300 vessels.  While primarily a producer of commercial vessels, it has also taken a number of contracts for the United States Navy, primarily for auxiliary vessels.  Most recently, Marinette Marine became part of a team with Lockheed Martin to produce one of two Littoral Combat Ship designs for the Navy, resulting in the launch of the USS Freedom on September 23, 2006. In 2010, Marinette Marine bid for work on the Ship-to-Shore Connector, which would replace the Landing Craft Air Cushion (LCAC).

On April 30, 2020, it was announced that Fincantieri Marinette Marine had won the contract to produce the United States Navy new Constellation-class multimission guided-missile frigate.

In 2019, Vice President Mike Pence and Secretary of Labor Eugene Scalia spoke at Marinette Marine Shipyard praising the Trump administration's support for American manufacturing industries and vocational education. One year later, during the 2020 presidential election, President Donald Trump himself held a reelection rally at the shipyard with Wisconsin State Assembly representatives John Nygren and Mary Felzkowski touting his administration's manufacturing policy, military expansion, and the United States–Mexico–Canada Agreement.

Facilities
All Marinette Marine facilities are located on the Menominee River in Marinette, Wisconsin.  Some of the specific facilities they comprise are as follows:
  of indoor ship construction space
  of indoor warehousing and receiving space
 Ship launching facility for up to 4,500 long tons
 Ship transport system for up to 1,600 tons
 Ship module movers for up to 160 tons
 275 ton yard crane
 100 ton yard crane
 40 ton yard cranes

Ships and boats built

Ships built by Marinette Marine include:

 Constellation-class frigate, United States Navy
 USS Constellation (FFG-62), on order
USS Congress (FFG-63), on order
USS Chesapeake (FFG-64), planned
 Freedom-class littoral combat ship, United States Navy 
 USS Freedom (LCS-1), launched in 2006, delivered 2008, and decommissionned in 2021 over quality problems
 USS Fort Worth (LCS-3), launched 2010, delivered 2012, and decommissionned in 2021 over quality problems.
 USS Milwaukee (LCS-5), launched December 2013 and delivered 2015
 USS Detroit (LCS-7), launched October 2014 and delivered 2016
 USS Little Rock (LCS-9), launched July, 2015 and delivered 2017 
 USS Sioux City (LCS-11), launched 30 January 2016 and delivered 2018
 USS Wichita (LCS-13), launched 17 September 2016 and delivered 2018
 USS Billings (LCS-15), launched 1 July 2017 and delivered 2019
 USS Indianapolis (LCS-17), launched 18 April 2018 and delivered 2019
 USS St. Louis (LCS-19), launched 15 December 2018 and delivered 2020
 USS Minneapolis-Saint Paul (LCS-21), launched 15 June 2019
 USS Cooperstown (LCS-23), launched 19 January 2020
 USS Marinette (LCS-25), launched 31 October 2020
 USS Nantucket (LCS-27), under construction
 USS Beloit (LCS-29), on order
 USS Cleveland (LCS-31), on order
 Multi-Mission Surface Combatant, Royal Saudi Naval Forces
 TBD (Four Ships on Order)
 Avenger-class mine countermeasures ship, United States Navy
 USS Defender (MCM-2), launched in 1987
 USS Champion (MCM-4), launched in 1989
 USS Patriot (MCM-7), launched in 1990
 Powhatan-class tugboat, United States Navy
 USNS Powhatan (T-ATF-166), launched in 1978
 USNS Narragansett (T-ATF-167), launched in 1979
 USNS Catawba (T-ATF-168), launched in 1979
 USNS Navajo (T-ATF-169), launched in 1979
 USNS Mohawk (T-ATF-170), launched in 1980
 USNS Sioux (T-ATF-171), launched in 1980
 USNS Apache (T-ATF-172), launched in 1981
 Natick-class tugboat, United States Navy
Manhattan (YTB-779), launched in 1965
 Redwing (YTB-783), launched in 1965
 Marinette (YTB-791), launched in 1967
Mecosta (YTB-818), launched in 1973
Wanamassa (YTB-820), launched in 1973
Canonchet (YTB-823), launched in 1973
Santaquin (YTB-824), launched in 1973
Dekanawida (YTB-831), launched in 1974
Skenandoa (YTB-835), launched in 1975
Pokagon (YTB-836), launched in 1975
 Juniper-class seagoing buoy tender, United States Coast Guard
 USCGC Juniper (WLB-201), launched in 1995
 USCGC Willow (WLB-202), launched in 1996
 USCGC Kukui (WLB-203), launched in 1997
 USCGC Elm (WLB-204), launched in 1997 or 1998
 USCGC Walnut (WLB-205), launched in 1998
 USCGC Spar (WLB-206), launched in 2000
 USCGC Maple (WLB-207), launched in 2000 or 2001
 USCGC Aspen (WLB-208), launched in 2001
 USCGC Sycamore (WLB-209), launched in 2001
 USCGC Cypress (WLB-210), launched in 2001
 USCGC Oak (WLB-211), launched in 2002
 USCGC Hickory (WLB-212), launched in 2002 or 2003
 USCGC Fir (WLB-213), launched in 2003
 USCGC Hollyhock (WLB-214), launched in 2003
 USCGC Sequoia (WLB-215), launched in 2003
 USCGC Alder (WLB-216), launched in 2004
 USCGC Mackinaw, launched in 2005
 ARRV Sikuliaq launched October 2012
 NOAAS Reuben Lasker launched June 2012 and delivered 2013
 Staten Island Ferries, New York City Department of Transportation
 MV Guy V. Molinari, delivered 2004 
 MV Senator John J. Marchi, delivered 2005 
 MV Spirit of America, delivered 2005
 MV Ocean Reliance (2002) and MV Coastal Reliance (2002), pusher tugs for Crowley Maritime petroleum barges on the west coast.

See also 
 :Category:Ships built by Marinette Marine

References

External links

FMM page in corporate website

 

Shipbuilding companies of the United States
Companies based in Wisconsin
Buildings and structures in Marinette County, Wisconsin
Fincantieri
Marinette micropolitan area